Lansana Sagna (born 17 February 1994) is a Senegalese professional footballer who plays as a centre back for French lower-league side US Feurs.

Career
Having played for FC Porto's U19-squad from 2012 to 2013, Sagna moved back to Senegal and played for Racing Club de Dakar. In January 2014, he signed with Újpest FC from Hungary together with his friend and teammate Elhadji Badiane Sidibe. 

On 5 December 2018, Sagna joined French club UMS Montélimar. He was released by the club in June 2019 and a few weeks later joined US Feurs.

References

External links
 
 MLSZ 
 HLSZ 

1994 births
Living people
Senegalese footballers
Association football defenders
Újpest FC players
AS Douanes (Senegal) players
UMS Montélimar players
US Feurs players
Nemzeti Bajnokság I players
Senegalese expatriate footballers
Expatriate footballers in Portugal
Senegalese expatriate sportspeople in Portugal
Expatriate footballers in Hungary
Senegalese expatriate sportspeople in Hungary
Expatriate footballers in France
Senegalese expatriate sportspeople in France